Mekong Hotel (thai: แม่โขงโฮเต็ล) is a 2012 Thai film directed by Apichatpong Weerasethakul. The film was screened in the Special Screenings section at the 2012 Cannes Film Festival.

Reception
Mekong Hotel has a 67% approval rating on Rotten Tomatoes and holds a 57/100 on Metacritic.

References

External links

2012 films
2012 drama films
Thai drama films
Thai-language films
Films directed by Apichatpong Weerasethakul